Smithland Farm, also known as the General John McCausland Memorial Farm, is a historic home and farm located near Henderson, Mason County, West Virginia. The main house is a two-story frame structure constructed in 1869. The house is a side-gabled, two-story, weatherboarded frame structure with a two-story frame wing.  The property includes a contributing corncrib (c. 1950), silo (c. 1930), pole barn (c. 1930s), barn (early 1900s), main barn (early 1900s), block school (c. 1915–1920), and Poffenbarger Cemetery (late 1900s). It was for many years part of a larger farm owned by Confederate General John McCausland. The West Virginia Department of Agriculture acquired the farm in 1981.

It was listed on the National Register of Historic Places in 2003.

See also
Gen. John McCausland House

References

External links
West Virginia Code: CHAPTER 19. AGRICULTURE. ARTICLE 26. GENERAL JOHN MCCAUSLAND MEMORIAL FARM.

Colonial Revival architecture in West Virginia
Farms on the National Register of Historic Places in West Virginia
Greek Revival houses in West Virginia
Houses completed in 1869
Houses in Mason County, West Virginia
Houses on the National Register of Historic Places in West Virginia
National Register of Historic Places in Mason County, West Virginia
1869 establishments in West Virginia